The 1983 Gator Bowl was an American college football bowl game played on December 30, 1983, at Gator Bowl Stadium in Jacksonville, FL. The matchup featured the 10th-ranked Iowa Hawkeyes of the Big Ten Conference and the 11th-ranked Florida Gators of the Southeastern Conference. The Gators won, 14–6, to secure their first top 10 ranking in the season's final polls.

Teams
The 1983 Gator Bowl was the first meeting between the two programs.

Iowa

Florida

Game summary

Scoring summary

Team statistics

Individual leaders
Passing
Iowa: Long – 13-28, 167 yds, 4 INT
Florida: Peace – 9-22, 92 yds, 2 INT

Rushing
Iowa: Gill – 10 carries, 83 yds; Granger – 9 carries, 37 yds
Florida: Anderson – 17 carries, 84 yds, 1 TD; Williams – 10 carries, 68 yds

Receiving
Iowa: Harmon – 6 catches, 90 yds
Florida: Dixon – 5 catches, 55 yds

References

Gator Bow
Gator Bowl
Florida Gators football bowl games
Iowa Hawkeyes football bowl games
December 1983 sports events in the United States